Free Land is a 1946 German drama film directed by Milo Harbich and starring Ursula Voß, Fritz Wagner and Herbert Wilk. The film was a work of propaganda made by DEFA in the Soviet occupation zone which later became East Germany. It uses a neorealist style to portray the effects of land reforms brought in by the Soviet authorities. It proved to be very unsuccessful on its release.

Cast
 Ursula Voß as Frau Jeruscheit
 Fritz Wagner as Neubauer Jeruscheit
 Herbert Wilk as Bürgermeister Siebold
 Hans Sternberg as Altbauer Strunk
 Aribert Grimmer as Altbauer Melzig
 Peter Marx as Altbauer Schulzke
 Oskar Höcker as Neubauer Kubinski
 Elfie Dugal as Küchenmädchen
 Kurt Mikulski as Siedler
 Karl Platen
 
 Albert Arid

References

Bibliography 
 Feinstein, Joshua. The Triumph of the Ordinary: Depictions of Daily Life in the East German Cinema, 1949–1989. University of North Carolina Press, 2002.
 Noack, Frank. Veit Harlan: The Life and Work of a Nazi Filmmaker. University Press of Kentucky, 2016.

External links 
 

1946 films
East German films
German drama films
German black-and-white films
1946 drama films
1940s German-language films
Films directed by Milo Harbich
Films shot in Germany
1940s German films